Dotti is an Italian surname. Notable people with the surname include:

Alan David Dotti (born 1977), Brazilian footballer
Andrea Dotti (disambiguation), multiple people
Carlo Francesco Dotti (1670–1759), Bolognese architect
Isabel Dotti (born 1947), Argentine mathematician
Juan Pablo Dotti (born 1984), Argentine cyclist
Mario Dotti, Italian rugby union player
Piero Dotti (born 1939), Italian footballer
Roberto Dotti (born 1961), Italian cyclist
Estefania Dotti (born 1974), Ecuadorian Journalist
¨^P^*POI

See also
Dotti (retailer), Australian fashion retailer

Italian-language surnames